Philip Jason Mojica (born March 6, 1978), better known as Syke Pachino (formerly Syko-Rah), is a Spanish-American hip-hop artist based out of Columbus, Georgia.

Early life
Originally from Leominster, Massachusetts, Syke Pachino eventually moved to Columbus, Georgia, where he spent most of his life and would go on to begin his career in music.

Career
In 2001 Syke signed his first recording contract with Flipn Flava Records, where he released his debut album titled "Georgiarican" under the name "Syko-Rah" and was supported by the single "Darkmoom Setting" which featured a guest appearance from former American Idol semi-finalist, Christopher Aaron. Shortly after the release, Syke went on an eight-year hiatus due to complications with the label and his personal life.

Also during this time, he linked up with Brett Life, a producer from Columbus, Ga and released the Def For Life Records' debut "The Rebirth" and recorded songs for the unreleased album, "Life Music".

In 2008, he decided to leave Flipn Flava and re-invent himself, recording under the name "Syke Pachino". A year after his departure, a second project "Political Prisoner" was released as a means to fulfill his contract.

During the later part of 2009, Syke linked up with Seagram Records (named after the slain Oakland rapper Seagram) to begin working on his next project. As a result, he released his third album "Live By The Code" in 2011.

Syke went on to be nominated for "Hip Hip Male Artist of the Year" at the 2012 GA Music Awards, held in Atlanta, Georgia.

Over the years Syke has worked with many notable artist such as Scarface, Bun B, Spice 1 and Bohagon just to name a few.

Syke has also been featured on tour alongside Young Bleed, Mr. Envi', Chucky Workclothes and others consecutively for the past two years, prepping for the upcoming "Hard Work Pays Off Tour", scheduled to start on April 28. His next release titled "Only Time Will Tell" is scheduled to be released early fall 2017, under his own label, Ear Hustlin' Entertainment.

Discography

Studio albums
Georgiarican (as Syko-Rah) - 2001
Political Prisoner (as Syko-Rah) - 2004
The Rebirth (as Syko-Rah) - 2005
Life Music (Unreleased) (as Syko-Rah) - 2005
Political Prisoner (2nd Issue) (as Syko-Rah) - 2009
Live By The Code - 2011
Only Time Will Tell - 2017

Mixtapes
The Vault (Bootlegs & G-Sides) - 2017

References

External links
 Official Website
 Syke Pachino on Discogs.

1982 births
Living people
Musicians from Columbus, Georgia
Underground rappers